The 1997 Japan Series was the Nippon Professional Baseball (NPB) championship series for the 1997 season. It was the 48th Japan Series and featured the Pacific League champions, the Seibu Lions, against the Central League champions, the Yakult Swallows. The series is the third time the two teams played each other for the championship, the last two contests being in 1992 and 1993. Played at Seibu Dome and Meiji Jingu Stadium, the Swallows defeated the Lions four games to one in the best-of-seven series to win the franchise's 4th Japan Series title. The Swallows' star catcher Atsuya Furuta was named Most Valuable Player of the series. The series was played between October 18 and October 23, 1997, with home field advantage going to the Pacific League.

Summary

Matchups

Game 1

Game 1 of the series featured a pitching match-up of two strong aces. Seibu's Fumiya Nishiguchi had a career year in 1997 (only his second full season), finishing first in the Pacific League in wins, strikeouts and winning percentage. His sparkling season earned him the Best Nine Award, the Golden Glove, the Sawamura Award and league MVP. Facing him in Game 1 from the visitor's side was Kazuhisa Ishii, a former number-one draft pick and established southpaw who had pitched a no-hitter earlier in the season. The game lived up to its billing as a pitcher's duel, with each starter not allowing any runs after seven innings. However, Yakult finally managed to get to Nishiguchi when journeyman Jim Tatum deposited a slider into the right-center field seats. Ishii protected this lead, and finished the game with no runs allowed and 12 strikeouts.

Game 2

Game 3

Game 4

Game 5

See also
1997 World Series

References

External links
 Nippon Professional Baseball—Official website (in English)

Japan Series
1997 Nippon Professional Baseball season
Tokyo Yakult Swallows
Seibu Lions